The seventh season of the animated television series, Aqua Teen Hunger Force originally aired in the United States on Cartoon Network's late night programming block, Adult Swim. Season seven started with special episode "A PE Christmas" on December 13, 2009, officially began with "Rabbot Redux" on February 7, 2010, and ended on May 2, 2010, with "One Hundred", with a total of twelve episodes. Aqua Teen Hunger Force is about the surreal adventures and antics of three anthropomorphic fast food items: Master Shake, Frylock, and Meatwad, who live together as roommates and frequently interact with their human next-door neighbor, Carl Brutananadilewski in a suburban neighborhood in South New Jersey. In May 2015, this season became available on Hulu Plus.

Season seven is notable for being the final season of the series to premiere as an Aqua Teen Hunger Force season, as the series started using alternative titles in 2011. Episodes in season seven were written and directed by Dave Willis and Matt Maiellaro. Almost every episode in this season features a special guest appearance, which continues a practice used in past seasons. This season has been made available on DVD, and other forms of home media, including on demand streaming.

Production

Every episode in this season was written and directed by series creators Dave Willis and Matt Maiellaro, who have both written and directed every episode of the series. All episodes originally aired in the United States on Cartoon Network's late night programming block, Adult Swim. This is the final season branded under the Aqua Teen Hunger Force title before Willis and Maiellaro started using a different alternative title for each season in 2011. As with most seasons, several episodes originally aired outside of their production order.

Season seven officially began with "Rabbot Redux" on February 7, 2010. "Rabbot Redux" is the conclusion of the season six finale, "Last Last One Forever and Ever", and features multiple references to the series' first episode, "Rabbot" and many other episodes as well. "Rabbot Redux" also featured a new intro and credits song, which was only used for that episode, performed by Schoolly D. "Rabbot Redux" marks Schoolly D's first appearance on Aqua Teen Hunger Force since season one, as well as Rabbot's first appearance since "The Last One". Also in "Rabbot Redux", it is revealed that Frylock has legs that simply retract into his body, which was never mentioned before.

Season seven also features the series' 100th episode, "One Hundred". The episode marks Dr Weird's first appearance since Aqua Teen Hunger Force Colon Movie Film for Theaters, as well as Handbanana's second appearance.

Cast
In season seven the main cast consisted of Dana Snyder as Master Shake, Carey Means as Frylock, and series co-creator Dave Willis as Meatwad and Carl Brutananadilewski.

Season seven also featured many guest appearances. Don Kennedy who had previously worked with Willis and Maiellaro on Space Ghost Coast to Coast as the voice of Tansit and The Brak Show, provided the voice of Lance in "Rubberman". Todd Barry voiced the birds in "Eggball". Musicians Michael Kohler and Chuck D voiced themselves in "A PE Christmas". Larry Miller voiced himself in the lead role and Gillian Jacobs voiced Carl's wife in "Larry Miller Hair System".  Bill Hader of Saturday Night Live voiced the pod and the band Chickenfoot voiced themselves in "IAMAPOD". In "Hands On a Hamburger" Craig Hartin provided the voice of Phil Samson. Paul F. Tompkins voiced the angel of the man Master Shake killed and Insane Clown Posse made a cameo as themselves in "Juggalo". Brooks Braselman played the main role of the ghost, as well its clones, in "Kangarilla and the Magic Tarantula". In "One Hundred" Robert Smigel voiced the One Hundred monster, Nick Weidenfeld voiced a television executive, Tom Savini voiced an unnamed cop, and Amber Nash voiced Master Shake's girlfriend Tabitha during "The Bayou Boo-Ya" segment.

Broadcast history
Season seven features "A PE Christmas", the first Aqua Teen Hunger Force Christmas episode since the season three episode, "T-Shirt of the Living Dead". "A PE Christmas" originally aired off-season as a Christmas special only twice on December 13, 2009. The episode was never rebroadcast again until it made its official premiere on March 14, 2010, where it aired as the fifth episode of the season in the television order. The official premiere featured the full ending that was not featured on either of the December 13, 2009 airings. The full ending has been featured in reruns of the episode ever since the March 14, 2010 debut.

Episodes

Reception
Ramsey Isler of IGN gave "Rubberman" an 8 out of 10, which is considered "Great" comparing the episode to a Horror Show, but also saying it was entertaining to watch. "Eggball" was given a 6.3 out of 10 which is considered "Okay", by Isler who thought the pinball themed episode had real potential but gave it a negative review calling it a "dud" and an incoherent mess and followed it up with "ATHF—it's always going to be random, and it's always going to be hit or miss". Isler appreciated "Multiple Meats" for being Meatwad centric and for not using dark humor or shock value comedy during the majority of the episode and ultimately gave the episode a 7.8 out of 10, which is considered "Good". Isler gave "Moster" a generally positive review but gave the ending some criticism for not being "as strong as it could have been" and ultimate gave the episode an 8.6 which is considered "Great". "Rabbot Redux" was given a 7 which is considered "Good" by Isler who found to be random, and gave the episode a neutral review, and claimed it was better than the Super Bowl XLIV half time show, which had aired earlier that night on CBS. Jonah Krakow of IGN, who reviewed the sneak peek version of "A PE Christmas" that aired on December 13, 2009, gave the episode an 8.5 which is considered "Great", he called it a good come back for the series after "Last Last One Forever and Ever" and compared it to several other Adult Swim Christmas specials that aired that month.

Home release

Five episodes from season seven were released on the Aqua Teen Hunger Force Volume Seven DVD set in Region 1 on June 1, 2010, along with six episodes from season six. The remaining episodes were released on the Aqua Unit Patrol Squad 1: Season 1 DVD set on October 11, 2011, along with the entire eighth season. Both sets were released by Adult Swim and distributed by Warner Home Video. Both sets feature completely uncensored audio, with Volume Seven marking the first time episodes were released uncensored. Both sets also feature special features. Both sets were later released in Region 4 by Madman Entertainment on June 16, 2010 and November 30, 2011 respectively.

This season was also released under the label "Season 8" in HD and SD on iTunes, the Xbox Live Marketplace, and Amazon Video under the label "Volume 8".

See also
 "One Hundred"
 List of Aqua Teen Hunger Force episodes
 Aqua Teen Hunger Force

References

External links

 Aqua Teen Hunger Force at Adult Swim
 Aqua Teen Hunger Force season 7 at the Internet Movie Database

2009 American television seasons
2010 American television seasons
Aqua Teen Hunger Force seasons